George Francis Graham-Brown  (27 January 1891 – 23 November 1942) was an Anglican bishop in the second quarter of the 20th century.

Life 
Graham-Brown was educated at Monkton Combe School and St Catharine's College, Cambridge.

After World War I service with the King's Own Scottish Borderers during which he was wounded in the head and eventually invalided out of the service, and three years as a History Master at his former school, he was ordained in 1922.

He was successively Chaplain, Vice-Principal then Principal of Wycliffe Hall, Oxford. In 1932 he was appointed the sixth Bishop in Jerusalem, a post he held for 10 years. He was consecrated a bishop on the Nativity of St John the Baptist (24 June) 1932, at St Paul's Cathedral, by Cosmo Lang, Archbishop of Canterbury. He was also a Sub-Prelate of the Order of St John of Jerusalem.

Having become a Doctor of Divinity (DD), he died in post on 23 November 1942 in a car accident. His grave is preserved in Mount Zion Cemetery, Jerusalem.

References

1891 births
People educated at Monkton Combe School
Alumni of St Catharine's College, Cambridge
Holders of a Lambeth degree
Anglican bishops of Jerusalem
20th-century Anglican archbishops
Officers of the Order of the British Empire
1942 deaths
Sub-Prelates of the Venerable Order of Saint John
Burials at Mount Zion (Protestant)
Principals of Wycliffe Hall, Oxford